Winslade is a hamlet and civil parish in the Basingstoke and Deane district of Hampshire, England. The parish of Winslade contains the vast Hackwood Park, an  Grade I listed Royal deer park. According to the 2011 census, Winslade, along with Tunworth, Weston Corbett and Weston Patrick, had a population of 224.

The manor of Winslade was held by Hugh de Port and his descendants from 1086 until 1555, after which it was bought by William, Marquis of Winchester. Hackwood Park was acquired by William Paulet, 1st Marquess of Winchester in the 16th century, and was used as a deer hunting park until the 20th century. Winslade contains 42 Grade II listed buildings, including Hackwood House, a Grade II* listed building. Its church, dedicated to St Mary, dates from 1816 and was Grade II listed on 26 April 1957.

History
The hamlet's name has been spelled in various ways, including Winesflot (11th century), Wineslode (13th century), Wynesflode (14th century), and Wyndslade (16th century). It formed a part of Winslade until 1876, when it was ceded to Dummer's parish under the Divided Parishes Act. Hackwood Park was acquired by William Paulet, 1st Marquess of Winchester in the 16th century and was used as a Royal deer park until the early 20th century.

The earliest mention of the manor of Winslade was made in 1086, when it was held by landowner Hugh de Port. In 1275, Winslade was owned by John de St John for "half a knight's fee" by Alan de Hagheman, who purchased the manor a year later. In 1316, the manor was passed to John de Knolle, who then granted it to John de Tichborne after his death in 1331. The manor had continued in his ownership by his descendants until 1555 when the manor was sold by William, Marquis of Winchester. William died in the same year he sold it, and consequently the land was passed onto his son Francis of Bolton, who was fined four shillings (equivalent to £26,700 in 2017) as lord of both Winslade and Kempshott for not attending the court of Basingstoke Hundred in 1560. It was sold to his overlord, John Marquess of Winchester, two years later, and his descendants continued to hold it until at least 1908. According to the 1901 census, Winslade had a population of 59.

Geography and demographics
The hamlet falls under the North East Hampshire parliament constituency, represented in the House of Commons by Conservative MP Ranil Jayawardena. The nearest schools to Winslade are those situated in Basingstoke, including St John's Church of English Primary School, Brighton Hill Community School, and Basingstoke College of Technology. The landscape is dominated by woodland and plantations, with the soil being mostly clay, the subsoil of chalk, and the most prominent crops being wheat, barley, oats and turnips. The parish contains Hackwood Park, an  Grade I listed Royal deer hunting park, which lies to the north.

According to the 2011 census, the parishes of Winslade, Tunworth, Weston Corbett and Weston Patrick collectively had a population of 224 people, of which 34.6% were in full-time employment, lower than the national average of 37.70%. There are 95 households in the four parishes with an average size of 2.36 people.

Climate

Notable landmarks

The parish of Winslade contains a total of 42 listed buildings—the majority of which are located in Hackwood Park—including three Grade II* listed. Hackwood House is an imposing mansion of symmetrical design, with the original structure dating from 1680. The exterior has four Neo-classical columns, which are situated in front of pilasters raised from the main wall surface. The central doorway is housed in an oval recess and also contains two columns and pilasters at the side. The interior of Hackwood House contains panelling and a large fireplace of late 17th century style, with a carved  ornamental festoon brought from Abbotstone House in Wiltshire.

Other listed buildings in Hackwood Park are the fishing temple, a once-domed building with eight columns and an incomplete circular stone base, a 19th-century teahouse pavilion, a single story mid-18th century orangey, a statue of George I which dates from 1722, and a late 19th-century mill house. Grade II* listed buildings include an early 19th-century stable block and riding school, and a menagerie pond pavilion, which dates from 1727 and was given as a gift by James Gibbs to the third Duke of Bolton.

The church of St Mary is a plain rectangular plan with a yellow brick tower and slate roofing. Although the site is old, the present church dates from 1816 and was Grade II listed on 26 April 1957. The church is described as a "rather unattractive building" with plastered walls, weathered stone bands and slender openings. Another place of worship was the Winslade Congregational Chapel, which is situated near a footpath leading to the villages of Herriard and Ellisfield. The chapel was opened in October 1888 by the fifth Earl of Portsmouth and Thomas Maton Kingdon, an ironmonger from Basingstoke. The deacons of London Street in Basingstoke decided to close it in 1930 and was eventually sold to the Portsmouth Estate five years later for £35.

References

External links

 Winslade Brief History
 History of Winslade, a hamlet in Basingstoke and Deane

Villages in Hampshire
Civil parishes in Basingstoke and Deane